Bajėnai II (Bajėnai 2nd, formerly) is a village in Kėdainiai district municipality, in Kaunas County, in central Lithuania. According to the 2011 census, the village had a population of 14 people. The village limits with the Šušvė Landscape Sanctuary. There is a cemetery.

History
At the 19th century there was a folwark, a property of the Tyszkiewicz family manor in Bajėnai I.

Demography

References

Villages in Kaunas County
Kėdainiai District Municipality